Ly Chan Siha is a Cambodian actress. She starred in the movies Gratefulness (2003) and Moronak Meada (2004). She won the award for Best Actress for playing the title role in Moronak Meada.

References 

Cambodian film actresses
Living people
21st-century Cambodian actresses
Year of birth missing (living people)